Lev Elterman (born January 14, 1969 in Leningrad, USSR), immigrated with his family in 1989 to the United States where he attended Rush Medical College. He graduated at the top of his class with a number of awards and then went on to urological residency at Rush University Medical Center.
 
He is serving as chief of the Urology section at Louis A. Weiss Memorial Hospital.
 
In 2001 Dr. Elterman founded the Chicago Association of Russian-speaking Physicians, a medical society devoted to continuing education of physicians of the Chicago area. He is also the president of this organization.
 
He is the founding chairman (2011) of the International Russian-speaking Urological Society, an organization dedicated to promoting highest standards in urological education for Russian speaking urologists around the world. This organization is recognized by the American Urological Association.1, 2. 

In 2019 Dr. Elterman was recognized as a top doctor for women by Chicago Magazine.

Publications

1. Laurence A. Levine, Lev Elterman, and Daniel B. Rukstalis: Treatment of subclinical intraurethral human papilloma virus infection with Interferon Alpha-2b, Urology 47: 553-557, 1996

2. Laurence A. Levine and Lev Elterman: Peyronie’s Disease and its Medical Management
in Male Infertility and Sexual Dysfunction. Wayne J.G Hellstrom editor. Springer-Verlag, New York. 474-480, 1997

3. Laurence A. Lev Elterman: Urethroplasty following total phallic reconstruction.
Journal of Urology 160: 378-382, 1998

4. Lev Elterman and Shaid Ekbal. An open prospective study of the safety and efficiency
transuratheral ablation in patients with trilobar benign prostatic hyperplasia.
Abstract 1168. Journal of Urology 161: 304, 1999

5. Patrick Guinan, Marvin Rubenstein, Michael Shaw, Charles F. McKiel and Lev Elterman .
African Americans Receive Therapy for Cure of Prostate Cancer st Rates Similar to Whites.
Abstract 1382. Journal of Urology 161:357, 1999

6. Lev Elterman, Kelly Bewsey, Gbriella Cs-Szabo, Ada Cole, Laurence A. Levine.
Connective tissue components of Peyronie’s disease plaque. Abstract 748.
Journal of Urology 163:169, 2000

7. Michael Shaw, Lev Elterman, Marvin Rubenstein, Charles F. McKiel, Jr.,Patrick Guinan.
Changes in radical prostatectomy and radiation therapy rates for African Americans and white.
Journal of the National Medical Association. 92(6): 284-1, 2000 Jun.

8. Laurence A. Levine, Lev Elterman. Rigiscan in Male sexual function: a guide to clinical management.
Edited by John J. Mulcahy. Totowa,N.J.: Humana Press, 2001

9. Kalian C. Latchamsetty, Lev Elterman, Christopher L. Coogan. Schwannoma of a seminal vesicle.
Urology. 60(3):515,2002 Sep.

10. Ernst W. Lisek, Lev Elterman, Charles F. McKiel, Jr., and Jerome Hoeksema.
Prostate Cancer in Surgical Oncology: An Algorithmic Approach for the General Suregon. T.J
Saclarides. K.W. Millikan, and C.V Godellas editors. Springer-Verlag, New York. 460-476,
2003.

11. David Sobel and Lev Elterman. Hematuria in Surgical Oncology: An Algorithmic Approach
Second Edition] T.J. Saclarides, K.W. Millikan, and C.V Godellas editors, Springer-Verlag,
New York. 2008

12. Lev Elterman. New Insights into the Medical Management of Idiopathic Male Infertility: What
Works, What Does Not and Does it Matter? Journal of Urology. vol 188, August 2012

13. Wei Phin Tan, Dimitri Papagiannopoulos, and Lev Elterman. Images in clinical Urology. Bear’s Paw sign: A Classic Presentation of Xanthogranulomatous Pyelonephritis. Urology. July 2015

14. Wei Phin Tan, Philip Alexandrov, Lev Elterman. Genital Dermatillomania. Current Urology Ms No.: 20161000

15. Jacob T. Emerson, Alexander M. Geisenhoff, Alexander K. Chow, & Lev Elterman. Ethical deliberation and management of attempted penile self-amputation in a male-to-female transgender person: case presentation and literature review. Taylor & Francis Online and Scandinavian Journal of Urology

References
CARP

External links
Elterman Center

American surgeons
Living people
1969 births